Elston is a village and parish in Nottinghamshire, England.

Elston may also refer to:

Places
 Elston, Indiana, an unincorporated community in the United States
 Elston, Missouri, an unincorporated community in the United States
 Elston, Wiltshire, a hamlet in England
 Elston, Queensland, the former name of Surfers Paradise, Queensland, Australia

People
 Arnold Elston (1907–1971), American composer and educator
 Bill Elston (1897–1968), Australian football player
 Charles H. Elston (1891–1980), American lawyer and politician
 Darrell Elston (born 1952), American basketball player
 Don Elston (1929–1995), American baseball player
 Gene Elston (1922–2015), American baseball broadcaster
 John A. Elston (1874–1921), American politician
 Lindsay Elston (born 1992), American soccer player
 Michael Elston (born 1969), American lawyer
 Murray Elston (born 1949), Canadian politician and business executive
 Robert C. Elston (born 1932), English statistical geneticist
 Elston-Stewart algorithm in genetics
 Tim Elston, Australian actor
 Elston Howard (1929–1980), American baseball player

Other uses
 Elston Avenue, Chicago, United States
 Elston Hall, New York, United States